Griseoxanthone C is an organic compound in the structural class of chemicals known as xanthones. Its chemical formula is 1,6-dihydroxy-3-methoxy-8-methylxanthen-9-one, and its molecular formula is C15H12O5. It is found in a plant and some fungi, including a lichen.

History
Griseoxanthone C was first isolated from the fungus Penicillium patulum by McMaster and colleagues in 1960. They were investigating the biosynthesis of the somewhat structurally related compound griseofulvin and discovered it in the residual material of the growth medium containing the fungi. A year later, another group studying griseofulvin biosynthesis discovered that the production of griseoxanthone C could be induced by inhibiting the chlorination of griseophenone C (an intermediate in the biosynthetic pathway leading to griseofulvin), and that griseoxanthone C could be created chemically from griseophenone C. Jayalakshmi and colleagues proposed a chemical synthesis of griseoxanthone C in 1974.

Properties
An ethanolic solution of griseoxanthone C reacts with iron(III) chloride to produce a violet-brown colour. Its ultraviolet spectrum has four peaks of maximum absorption (λmax) at 242, 269, 309, and 340 nm.

In laboratory tests, griseoxanthone C showed strong antibiotic effects toward Bacillus subtilis and methicillin-resistant Staphylococcus aureus. It also has strong cytotoxicity to Hep2 liver cancer cells in in vitro experiments.

Occurrence
In 1992, John Elix and Caroline Crook reported griseoxanthone C from the lichen Lecanora vinetorum. It has since been reported from various other species, including the flowers of the plant Ficus hookeriana, the fungi Fusarium equiseti, Penicillium concentricum, and Urocladium.

See also
 Lichexanthone

References

Xanthones
Lichen products
Methoxy compounds